Yuri Apollonovich Zhemchuzhnikov (Samara – 9 January 1957, Leningrad) was a Russian and Soviet geologist. He became professor at the Leningrad Mining University in 1920 and was a noted expert in petrography. The mineral Zhemchuzhnikovite is named after him.

References

External links
 

1885 births
1957 deaths
20th-century Russian scientists
Scientists from Samara, Russia
Recipients of the Order of Lenin
Recipients of the Order of the Red Banner of Labour
Russian geologists
Soviet geologists